GreenSpace is a social network game created to promote environmentalism. The game was developed by RocketOwl, Inc. and launched December 1, 2011. The game is free with in-app purchases.

Gameplay 

Humans have been sending their trash into the galaxy for the past 300 years, unintentionally littering surrounding planets in the process. SpaceJanitors of the trash-clearing GreenSpace Corps are sent into outer space clean up the planets and make them habitable again. Players select pieces of trash for their GreenSpace Corps avatar to clear. Energy is required to clear trash off the planet. Players receive rewards for cleaning in the form of experience points and credits immediately after each piece of trash is cleaned.

Credits are used to build structures. Some structures can also produce credits, releasing the credits after an interval ranging from 15 minutes to one hour. RocketFuel, a special in-game credit, is earned by sharing the game with Facebook friends and by interacting with them in-game. Rocket fuel is used to perform actions en-masse, such as repairing all the buildings in a quadrant.

Players level-up by collecting experience points. Large pieces of garbage require the player to reach higher level before they can be cleared. Players can also gain experience by completing missions. Once a quadrant of the island is clear of trash, the player can build structures to produce additional energy and credits.

Monetization 
Players can purchase RockeFuel and in-game credits using real-world money to help them advance more quickly through missions and upgrade their world and Greenspace Corps avatar.

GreenSpace participated in the now-defunct Facebook Credits program. Facebook credits could be put toward in-game purchases, such as additional RocketFuel.

Development 
GreenSpace cost of US$800,000 to develop over the course of 2010 and 2011. The game began its open beta in August 2011 and soft launched in December 1, 2011.

On August 2, 2012, GreenSpace received a major update.

In September 2012, GreenSpace was released for iPad.

Partnerships 
In August 2012,  RocketOwl and reforestation organization WeForest.org announced the Play2Plant partnership. As players reach in-game milestones in GreenSpace, trees will be planted by WeForest to reflect their progress.

In November 2012, as part of its partnership with weforest.org, RocketOwl announced that it would plant a tree for every new GreenSpace player until the end of 2012. This  resulted in more than 10,000 trees planted.

Reception
In November 2012, GreenSpace hit a high of 80,000 monthly active users.

Canadian Videogame Awards 2012 - Finalist for Best Social/Casual Game.

Legacy
A sequel called BlueSpace is in development and is expected to launch on all devices.

References

External links
 The GreenSpace Update: Adventures on iOS
 RocketOwl Unveils Massive Update for Facebook Title GreenSpace
 GreenSpace iPad App on iTunes Store

2011 video games
Environmental education video games
Facebook games
Flash games
IOS games
Online games
Video games about plants
Video games developed in Canada